is a private junior college in Sapporo, Hokkaido, Japan, established in 1953.

External links
 Official website 

Educational institutions established in 1953
Private universities and colleges in Japan
Universities and colleges in Sapporo
Japanese junior colleges
1953 establishments in Japan